Aleš Urbánek (born 25 May 1980) is retired Czech footballer.

Career

After leaving Sigma Olomouc, Urbanek played for Spartak Moscow in Russia but left after six months due to lack of playing time.

References

External links
 
 
 

1980 births
Living people
People from Slavičín
Czech footballers
Czech Republic youth international footballers
Czech Republic under-21 international footballers
Czech First League players
SK Sigma Olomouc players
FC Spartak Moscow players
Czech expatriate footballers
Russian Premier League players
Expatriate footballers in Russia
AC Sparta Prague players
SK Slavia Prague players
1. FC Slovácko players
FC Petržalka players
FK Senica players
TJ Baník Ružiná players
Expatriate footballers in Slovakia
Slovak Super Liga players
FC DAC 1904 Dunajská Streda players
Association football midfielders
Sportspeople from the Zlín Region